The 2021 ACC women's basketball tournament concluded the 2020–21 season of the Atlantic Coast Conference and was held at the Greensboro Coliseum in Greensboro, North Carolina, from March 3–7, 2021. NC State defended their title to earn the ACC's automatic bid to the 2021 NCAA Women's Division I Basketball Tournament.

Seeds
All of the ACC teams except Duke and Virginia participated in the tournament. The remaining teams were seeded by record within the conference, with a tiebreaker system to seed teams with identical conference records. The top four seeds received double byes, while seeds 5 through 11 received single byes.  The seeds were determined on February 28, 2021, after the final regular season games finished.

Schedule

Source:

Bracket

Game summaries

First round

Second round

Quarterfinals

Semifinals

Final

All-Tournament Teams

See also 

 2021 ACC men's basketball tournament

References 

2020–21 Atlantic Coast Conference women's basketball season
ACC women's basketball tournament
Basketball competitions in Greensboro, North Carolina
ACC Women's Basketball
Women's sports in North Carolina